Slovene Studies is a peer-reviewed academic journal covering research on Slovenes as ethnic group and on Slovene culture. It is published by the Society for Slovene Studies and was established in 1973 as Papers in Slovene Studies. It was originally edited by the Slovene linguist Rado Lenček. The journal has been published under its current title since 1979. The editor-in-chief is Timothy Pogacar (Bowling Green State University). The journal addresses international aspects of studies related to ethnic Slovenes and Slovene language and culture.

References

External links 
 
 Journal page at society website
 Society for Slovene Studies
 

Biannual journals
Publications established in 1973
Slavic studies journals
English-language journals
Slovene language
Academic journals published by learned and professional societies
Works about Slovenia